The Tower of Capu di Muru is a Genoese tower located in the commune of Coti-Chiavari, on the west coast of Corsica.

The tower was built in around 1600. It was one of a series of coastal defences constructed by the Republic of Genoa between 1530 and 1620 to stem the attacks by Barbary pirates. In 1994 the tower was listed as one of the official historical monuments of France.

The tower is owned and maintained by the Collectivité Territoriale de Corse in an agreement with the French government agency, the Conservatoire du littoral. The agency plans to purchase  of the headland and as of 2017 had acquired .

See also
List of Genoese towers in Corsica

References

External links
 Includes information on how to reach 90 towers and many photographs.

Towers in Corsica
Monuments historiques of Corsica